The Criminal Life of Archibaldo de la Cruz (original Spanish title: Ensayo de un crimen, "Rehearsal for a Murder") is a 1955 Mexican crime film by Spanish-born writer-director Luis Buñuel.  It focuses on a would-be serial killer whose plans, although elaborate, never result in an actual murder.

Plot
Archibaldo de la Cruz (Alonso) is a wealthy Mexican man. As a privileged child during the Mexican Revolution, he witnessed the death of his governess, who died as she told him a fable about a music box that his mother had just given him. Because of the contents of the story and the coincidental timing of the governess's death, a young Archibaldo concludes that he had killed the woman using the music box. It is from there that his desire to kill begins.

As an adult, Archibaldo relates this story to a nun, and threatens to kill her with a straight razor. The terrified woman runs from Archibaldo, eventually running into an empty elevator shaft to her death. Archibaldo is called in by a judge investigating the incident. He confesses that he is responsible for her death, and for many others.

Patricia Terrazas (Macedo), is rather loud and constantly at conflict with her lover.  After witnessing a fight between her and her lover, Archibaldo follows her and offers to drive her home, which she accepts.  On arriving, he fantasizes of killing her with his straight razor, but is interrupted when her lover arrives home. The next morning a police officer arrives at Archibaldo's home, with news that Patricia had committed suicide.

Next, Archibaldo turns his attention to Carlota Cervantes (Welter), a woman very religious, and is purported to be a virgin. However, she is having an affair with a married man. Archibaldo approaches her saying that he is very conflicted between good and evil (it is later revealed that she is somewhat like him). He thinks that Carlota can fix his problems, and proposes to marry her.

In the meantime, Archibaldo pursues another woman, Lavinia (Miroslava), whom he met in an antique shop, and later a bar. Lavinia works as a model for mannequins, and also shows American tourists around town. Archibaldo invites Lavinia to his home under false pretenses. He tells her that when they met, she reminded him of Joan of Arc being consumed by flames. He plots to strangle her and burn her in a kiln, but unexpectedly, the doorbell rings. It is Lavinia's tourist friends, the gringuitos. Lavinia has a disappointed Archibaldo take them on a tour of his home. When they leave, Lavinia says that she must go as well, and that she cannot see Archibaldo again because she is getting married.

Just as this is happening, Carlota comes in with her mother to accept Archibaldo's proposal. But Archibaldo soon learns of her adulterous relationship, and is displeased.  He fantasizes about making her kneel and pray on her wedding night, and shooting her while she is praying. The wedding goes through, however, her jilted ex-lover ends up shooting her instead.

After having heard all of this, the judge says that Archibaldo has committed no crimes, and that merely thinking of killing people is not a crime. Archibaldo, despite his intense feelings of guilt, is deemed innocent. As if to be processing this unexpected reaction, Archibaldo takes a walk in the park. He then throws his music box into a lake, and moves on. He runs into Lavinia, whose marriage did not work out. The two walk together and the film ends.

Cast 
 Miroslava as Lavinia
 Ernesto Alonso as Archibaldo de la Cruz
 Rita Macedo as Patricia Terrazas
 Ariadna Welter as Carlota Cervantes
 Andrea Palma as Mrs. Cervantes
 Rodolfo Landa as Alejandro Rivas
 José María Linares-Rivas as Willy Corduran 
 Leonor Llausás as The Governess
 Eva Calvo as- Señora de la Cruz, Archibaldo's mother
 Enrique Díaz as Señor de la Cruz, Archibaldo's father 
 Carlos Riquelme as The Commissioner
 Chabela Durán as Sister Trinidad
 Carlos Martínez Baena as a priest 
 Manuel Dondé as a colonel at Archibaldo's wedding

Academic criticism
The film has been analyzed and studied by international academics such as Victor Fuentes and Gerardo T. Cummings. Fuentes, a retired professor from University of California, Santa Barbara, has included chapters dedicated to the detailed analytical study of Ensayo de un crimen in his last book, La mirada de Buñuel (Spain: Tabla Rasa Libros y Ediciones, 2006). Furthermore, he has found correlations between Ensayo de un crimen and Él.

Gerardo T. Cummings, on the other hand, published an article—by the Puerto Rican journal Revista Horizontes in 2004—on the intertextual connections between the cinematic version and the original literary source, the novel by Rodolfo Usigli. The article was part of a larger dissertation chapter on the echoes of the novel in the film. Other critics who have dissected the film version of Ensayo de un crimen have been Marsha Kinder and Ilan Stavans.

Buñuel briefly references the production of  Ensayo de un crimen in his 1983 autobiography Mon dernier soupir (My Last Breath). In it, he recounts how he was syndicated into orchestrating an original composition for the movie, and that when the entirety of the members of the orchestra disrobed due to heat, he saw that "at least 3/4ths of them carried holstered guns". Later in the book, he sadly recalls the ironic parallel between a scene where the protagonist cremates a wax mannequin based on Miroslava, and Miroslava's actual cremation following her suicide shortly after production wrapped up.

Its exploration of obsessive desire has been compared to Alfred Hitchcock's Vertigo (1958).

Slant Magazine, in 2002, called it "a twisted tragicomedy on male obsession [...] the closest Spanish auteur Luis Buñuel ever came to directing a bona fide suspense thriller."

References

External links

1955 films
Mexican crime comedy films
1950s Spanish-language films
Mexican black-and-white films
1950s black comedy films
Mexican satirical films
1950s crime comedy films
1950s serial killer films
Films set in Mexico
Films directed by Luis Buñuel
Mannequins in films
1950s satirical films
Mexican black comedy films
1955 comedy films
1955 drama films
1950s Mexican films